Tobias Nath (born 1979 in Bochum, Germany) is a German voice actor. He is married to Rubina Kuraoka.

Dubbing roles (excerpt) 
 Eddie Redmayne (as Balem Abrasax) in Jupiter Ascending
 Michael Cyril Creighton (as Jake) in The Post

Audiobooks 
 2017: Captain Underpants: Großangriff der schnappenden Klo-Schüsseln ... und noch ein Abenteuer, der Hörverlag,

External links

Schott & Kreutzer Agency Hamburg 
Tobias Nath at the German Dubbing Card Index

1979 births
Living people
German male television actors
People from Bochum